Dan Westover (born March 10, 1974) is an American biathlete. He competed in the men's sprint event at the 1998 Winter Olympics.

References

External links
 

1974 births
Living people
American male biathletes
Olympic biathletes of the United States
Biathletes at the 1998 Winter Olympics
Place of birth missing (living people)
U.S. Army World Class Athlete Program